Alsophila ferruginea, synonym Cyathea ferruginea, is a species of tree fern endemic to the Philippines. It is native to the islands of Negros, Palawan and Balabac.

Description
The stipe bears short spines and sparse scales, which are dark brown in colour and have pale, narrow, fragile edges. Sori occur near the fertile pinnule midvein and are covered by thin, pale indusia.

Large and Braggins (2004) note that the specific epithet ferruginea, meaning "rust-coloured", may refer to the brown scales of this species.

References

ferruginea
Ferns of Asia
Endemic flora of the Philippines
Flora of the Visayas
Flora of Palawan